The  Versailles Synagogue is situated at 10, rue Albert Joly in Versailles in the Department of Yvelines. It is one of the oldest Synagogues in the Île-de-France. Built between 1884 and 1886 by the architect Alfred-Philibert Aldrophe (1834–1895), it was inaugurated in 1886.

Description 
From an architectural standpoint, this Ashkenazi synagogue is classical in style with a massive front buttress and is embellished with Byzantine ornamentation. There is a desire to make an imposing, monument, on whose pediment is a large Sefer Torah replacing what were hitherto discreet symbols of identity in the city.

The facade of the building is north-facing and never gets the sun, neither do windows to the south which is a facing a wall, this is unusual as synagogues are generally more oriented west–east.

Above the portal are carved in Hebrew the following Biblical verses:

"Blessed are you at your coming and blessed art thou in thy going out" (Deuteronomy 28.6)

"Come in turmoil into the house of God" (Psalms 55.15)

And on top of the building:

"Thou shalt love the Lord" (Deuteronomy 11:1)

"Thou shalt love thy neighbor as thyself" (Leviticus 19:18)

The synagogue is still in operation (the rabbi is Mr. Beldheb) but now follows the Sephardi rite and the present community is mainly from Morocco. The grandfather of the anthropologist and ethnologist Claude Lévi-Strauss was at one-time the rabbi of this synagogue.

It is possible to visit during certain occasions such as the National Day of Remembrance for Victims and Heroes of the Deportation, when it is open to the public.

To the left of the synagogue is the rabbinic residence.

The Jewish cemetery of Versailles

The Jewish cemetery in Versailles is in the same area as the synagogue (Versailles Rive Droite). It is arranged in terraces on a slope surrounded by greenery at 3, rue General Pershing, and contains about 400 graves. The cemetery, which was authorized by King Louis XVI in 1788, is one of the few Jewish cemeteries dating from before the French revolution. Most date from the 19th century.

There is also a Jewish section in the southwest corner of Cemetery Gonards. There is a tomb bearing the inscription "THE PROMISED LAND TO ITS MEMBERS." "Promised Land" was a Jewish society founded in Paris under the Second French Empire, which met until 1970, whose purpose was to render the last honors to ensure a dignified burial for the poor, to prevent them from ending up buried in a common site. The society had several hundred members who paid originally an annual fee of 15 francs.

References

External links
 Site de la synagogue de Versailles

Ashkenazi Jewish culture in France
Ashkenazi synagogues
Synagogues in France
Buildings and structures in Versailles
Jewish cemeteries in France
Synagogues completed in 1886